William Frank Norrell (August 29, 1896 – February 15, 1961) was a U.S. Representative from Arkansas' former 6th congressional district. Upon his death, he was succeeded in Congress by his widow, Catherine Dorris Norrell.

Born in Milo in Ashley County in south Arkansas, Norrell attended the public schools, the University of Arkansas at Monticello, then known as  Arkansas Agricultural and Mechanical College, the University of the Ozarks, then College of the Ozarks in Clarksville, Arkansas, and the  University of Arkansas at Little Rock Law School. During World War I, Norrell served in the Quartermaster Corps of the United States Army. In 1920, he was admitted to the bar and commenced practice in Monticello in Drew County, Arkansas. From 1930 to 1938, Norrell served as member of the Arkansas State Senate. He was the Senate President from 1934 to 1938 under Lieutenant Governors William Lee Cazort and Robert L. Bailey.

Norrell was elected as a Democrat to the Seventy-sixth and to the eleven succeeding Congresses and served from January 3, 1939, until his death in Washington, D.C. He was a signatory to the 1956 Southern Manifesto that opposed the desegregation of public schools ordered by the Supreme Court in Brown v. Board of Education.

He is interred beside his wife at Oakland Cemetery in Monticello, Arkansas.

See also
 List of United States Congress members who died in office (1950–99)

Note

References

External links

 

1896 births
1961 deaths
20th-century American politicians
American segregationists
Democratic Party Arkansas state senators
Democratic Party members of the United States House of Representatives from Arkansas
Military personnel from Arkansas
People from Monticello, Arkansas
People from Ashley County, Arkansas
United States Army personnel
University of Arkansas at Monticello alumni
University of Arkansas School of Law alumni
University of the Ozarks alumni